The Penn State–Syracuse football rivalry is an American college football rivalry between the Penn State Nittany Lions and Syracuse Orange.

History 
The rivalry started in 1922, when Syracuse fought Penn State to a 0–0 tie. But it was during the 1950s and 1960s that the rivalry intensified, as it enjoyed a competitive and very controversial string of contests. In 1953, after Lenny Moore intercepted a pass to seal a 20–14 Penn State victory, he was shoved out of bounds into the Syracuse bench. A Syracuse player jumped on Moore and a wild brawl started. Fans jumped out of the stands to join in. The fighting went on for several minutes before order was restored and Penn State took a knee to end the game. Syracuse football was led by Ben Schwartzwalder, and Penn State by Rip Engle, then Joe Paterno. From 1950 to 1970, Syracuse won 11 games to Penn State's 10. Penn State leads the series 43–23–5.

After Schwartzwalder retired in 1973, Syracuse floundered. Penn State won 16 straight from 1971 to 1986. Conference realignment and scheduling disagreements also dampened the intensity of the rivalry. Penn State fans and players increasingly turned their attention to the rivalry with Pittsburgh.

In 1987, Coach Dick MacPherson finally led Syracuse to a resounding 48–21 victory over the Nittany Lions in the Dome. Syracuse won again the following year in Happy Valley but lost the last two games before the series was suspended in 1991.

Rivalry resumed 
In 2002, it was announced that the two teams would revive the rivalry by scheduling a home-and-home series in 2008 and 2009.

After an almost twenty-year break in the series, the two programs played in Syracuse's Carrier Dome on September 13, 2008, with the Nittany Lions prevailing 55–13 over the Orange. The contest didn't generate a sellout crowd at the Carrier Dome. They met again the next year. Penn State won 28–7. After a 4-year break, in 2013 the two teams met again, this time at MetLife Stadium, in front of 61,202 fans; Penn State won 23–17.

On May 4, 2022, the two schools announced a home-and home series in 2027 and 2028.

Game results

See also  
 List of NCAA college football rivalry games

References

College football rivalries in the United States
Penn State Nittany Lions football
Syracuse Orange football